E110 may refer to:
 Darmstadtium, element 110 in the periodic table
 Sunset Yellow FCF, a food colourant
 Embraer EMB 110 Bandeirante, a twin-turboprop light aircraft
 A medical form for international road hauliers, replaced by the European Health Insurance Card
 E110 Out-of-town travel, a Uniform Task-Based Management System expense code
 A form of Zircaloy, a corrosion-resistant Russian Zirconium-Niobium alloy used in nuclear reactors
 Toyota Corolla (E110), the eight generation in a line of Japanese compact cars, manufactured from 1995 to 2002
 Acer beTouch E110, a smartphone